JMT may refer to:

 JMT Records, a German record label
 Jedi Mind Tricks, an American hip hop group
 Jesus myth theory
 John Michael Talbot (born 1954), an American musician
 John Muir Trail, in California
 John Muir Trust, a Scottish charitable company
 Journal of Music Theory
 Juaymah Maureen Transport, a Filipino bus company